A thermal-neutron reactor is a nuclear reactor that uses slow or thermal neutrons. ("Thermal" does not mean hot in an absolute sense, but means in thermal equilibrium with the medium it is interacting with, the reactor's fuel, moderator and structure, which is much lower energy than the fast neutrons initially produced by fission.)

Most nuclear power plant reactors are thermal reactors and use a neutron moderator to slow neutrons until they approach the average kinetic energy of the surrounding particles, that is, to reduce the speed of the neutrons to low-velocity, thermal neutrons. Neutrons are uncharged, this allows them to penetrate deep in the target and close to the nuclei, thus scattering neutrons by nuclear forces, some nuclides are scattered large.

The nuclear cross section of uranium-235 for slow thermal neutrons is about 1000 barns, while for fast neutrons it is in the order of 1 barn.
Therefore thermal neutrons are more likely to cause uranium-235 to nuclear fission than to be captured by uranium-238. If at least one neutron from the U-235 fission strikes another nucleus and causes it to fission, then the chain reaction will continue. If the reaction will sustain itself, it is said to be critical, and the mass of U-235 required to produce the critical condition is said to be a critical mass.

Thermal reactors consist of the following:

 Neutron moderator to slow down the neutrons. In light water reactors and heavy water reactors it doubles as the nuclear reactor coolant.
 Nuclear fuel, which is a fissile material, usually uranium.
 Reactor vessel that is a pressure vessel containing the coolant and reactor core.
 Radiation shielding to protect people and the environment from the harmful effects of ionizing radiation.
 Containment buildings which are designed to contain the escape of radiation in an emergency.
 Instrumentation to monitor and control the reactor's systems.

See also
 Thermal breeder reactor
 Enriched uranium
 Fast-neutron reactor
 Liquid fluoride thorium reactor
 India's three stage nuclear power programme

References

Nuclear reactors